Deinococcota (synonym, Deinococcus-Thermus) is a phylum of bacteria with a single class, Deinococci, that are highly resistant to environmental hazards, also known as extremophiles.
These bacteria have thick cell walls that give them gram-positive stains, but they include a second membrane and so are closer in structure to those of gram-negative bacteria.

Taxonomy
The phylum Deinococcota consists of a single class (Deinococci) and two orders:
 The Deinococcales include two families (Deinococcaceae and Trueperaceae), with three genera, Deinococcus, Deinobacterium and Truepera. Truepera radiovictrix is the earliest diverging member of the order. Within the order, Deinococcus forms a distinct monophyletic cluster with respect to Deinobacterium and Truepera species. The genus includes several species that are resistant to radiation; they have become famous for their ability to eat nuclear waste and other toxic materials, survive in the vacuum of space and survive extremes of heat and cold.
 The Thermales include several genera resistant to heat (Marinithermus, Meiothermus, Oceanithermus, Thermus, Vulcanithermus, Rhabdothermus) placed within a single family, Thermaceae. Phylogenetic analyses demonstrate that within the Thermales, Meiothermus and Thermus species form a monophyletic cluster, with respect to Marinithermus, Oceanithermus, Vulcanithermus and Rhabdothermus that branch as outgroups within the order. This suggests that Meiothermus and Thermus species are more closely related to one another relative to other genera within the order. Thermus aquaticus was important in the development of the polymerase chain reaction where repeated cycles of heating DNA to near boiling make it advantageous to use a thermo-stable DNA polymerase enzyme.

Though these two groups evolved from a common ancestor, the two mechanisms of resistance appear to be largely independent.

Molecular signatures
Molecular signatures in the form of conserved signature indels (CSIs) and proteins (CSPs) have been found that are uniquely shared by all members belonging to the Deinococcota phylum. These CSIs and CSPs are distinguishing characteristics that delineate the unique phylum from all other bacterial organisms, and their exclusive distribution is parallel with the observed differences in physiology. CSIs and CSPs have also been found that support order and family-level taxonomic rankings within the phylum. Some of the CSIs found to support order level distinctions are thought to play a role in the respective extremophilic characteristics. The CSIs found in DNA-directed RNA polymerase subunit beta and DNA topoisomerase I in Thermales species may be involved in thermophilicity, while those found in Excinuclease ABC, DNA gyrase, and DNA repair protein RadA in Deinococcales species may be associated with radioresistance.<ref name="pmid 15454524">{{cite journal |vauthors= Tanaka M, Earl AM, Howell HA, Park MJ, Eisen JA, Peterson SN, Battista JR |title= Analysis of Deinococcus radioduranss transcriptional response to ionizing radiation and desiccation reveals novel proteins that contribute to extreme radioresistance |journal=Genetics |volume=168 |issue=1|pages=21–23 |year=2004|pmid=15454524|doi=10.1534/genetics.104.029249| url=http://www.genetics.org/content/168/1/21.long |pmc=1448114}}</ref> Two CSPs that were found uniquely for all members belonging to the Deinococcus genus are well characterized and are thought to play a role in their characteristic radioresistant phenotype. These CSPs include the DNA damage repair protein PprA the single-stranded DNA-binding protein DdrB.

Additionally, some genera within this group, including Deinococcus, Thermus, and Meiothermus, also have molecular signatures that demarcate them as individual genera, inclusive of their respective species, providing a means to distinguish them from the rest of the group and all other bacteria. CSIs have also been found specific for Truepera radiovictrix .

Phylogeny

Taxonomy
The currently accepted taxonomy is based on the List of Prokaryotic names with Standing in Nomenclature (LPSN) and National Center for Biotechnology Information (NCBI)

 Phylum Deinococcota Oren and Garrity 2021
 Class Deinococci Garrity & Holt 2002 ["Deinococcia" Oren, Parte & Garrity 2016 ex Cavalier-Smith 2020; "Thermi" Rinke et al. 2013; "Thermia" Cavalier-Smith 2020]
 Order Deinococcales Rainey et al. 1997 [Trueperales García-López et al. 2020]
 Family Deinococcaceae Brooks and Murray 1981 emend. Rainey et al. 1997
 Genus Deinococcus Brooks and Murray 1981 emend. Rainey et al. 1997
 Genus Deinobacterium Ekman et al. 2011
 Family Trueperaceae Rainey et al. 2005
 Genus Truepera da Costa, Rainey and Albuquerque 2005
 Order Thermales''' Rainey and Da Costa 2002
 Family Thermaceae Da Costa and Rainey 2002
 Genus "Allomeiothermus" Jiao et al. 2022
 Genus Calidithermus Raposo et al. 2019
 Genus Marinithermus Sako et al. 2003
 Genus Meiothermus Nobre et al. 1996 emend. Albuquerque et al. 2009
 Genus Oceanithermus Miroshnichenko et al. 2003 emend. Mori et al. 2004
 Genus Rhabdothermus Steinsbu et al. 2011
 Genus Thermus Brock and Freeze 1969 emend. Nobre et al. 1996
 Genus Vulcanithermus Miroshnichenko et al. 2003

Sequenced genomes
Currently there are 10 sequenced genomes of strains in this phylum.Deinococcus radiodurans R1Thermus thermophilus HB27Thermus thermophilus HB8Deinococcus geothermalis DSM 11300Deinococcus deserti VCD115Meiothermus ruber DSM 1279Meiothermus silvanus DSM 9946Truepera radiovictrix DSM 17093Oceanithermus profundus DSM 14977

The two Meiothermus'' species were sequenced under the auspices of the Genomic Encyclopedia of Bacteria and Archaea project (GEBA), which aims at sequencing organisms based on phylogenetic novelty and not on pathogenicity or notoriety.

See also
 List of bacteria genera
 List of bacterial orders

References

 
Bergey's volume 1
Polyextremophiles
Bacteria phyla